Reverend George Ripley Bliss (June 20, 1816 – March 21, 1893) was an American cleric and educator.  He served twice as president of Bucknell University.

Early life
George R. Bliss was born in Sherburne, New York on June 20, 1816.  He graduated from Hamilton College and Hamilton Theological Seminary and became a Baptist clergyman.

Career
Bliss taught Greek (filling the department chair from 1849 to 1874), Latin, and biblical exegesis at Bucknell and at Crozer Theological Seminary, and he served as librarian of Bucknell University.  He served as university president twice, in 1857–1858 and 1871–72.

Death and burial
Bliss died in Lewisburg, Pennsylvania on March 21, 1893.  He was buried at Lewisburg Cemetery.

Family
Bliss was married to Mary Ann Raymond Bliss (1821 - 1912).  One of their 13 children, General Tasker Howard Bliss was most notable.  He served as Chief of Staff of the United States Army from 1917 until 1918.

References

External links
Bliss, George Ripley, and Johnson, Franklin, Moses and Israel: Sacred text of the lessons, American Bible Union (1874)
Bliss, George Ripley, and Fay, Fr. Rud, The book of Joshua, Scribner, Armstrong, 1875
 Bliss, George Ripley, Commentary on the Gospel of Luke, American commentary on the New Testament American Baptist Publication Society, 1884

1816 births
1893 deaths
Hamilton College (New York) alumni
Colgate Rochester Crozer Divinity School alumni
Presidents of Bucknell University